A bit is a symbol used for communication or,
equivalently, a unit of information storage on a computer.
A bit is also used as a unit of information.

Bit or BIT may also refer to:

Tools and engineering
 Drill bit, for drilling holes
 Screwdriver bit
 Tool bit, for lathe turning
 Bit key, a key with a distinct part that engages the locking mechanism.  The shape described by the bitting.
 Bit (horse), part of horse tack placed in the mouth
 The cutting edge of an axe
 The heated part of a soldering iron

Arts and entertainment
 Unit of action or bit, in acting
 Bit part, a minor role
 Bit, material from a standup comedian's repertoire
 Bit, in the list of Tron characters
 Bit (film), a 2019 vampire film

Organisations
 Behavioural Insights Team, a social engineering organization
 Bit Corporation, a video game company
 Bipolar Integrated Technology, a former American semiconductor company
 BIT Teatergarasjen, Norwegian theatre and dance company
 Bright Ideas Trust, British social enterprise

Education
 Bearys Institute of Technology, a private technical co-educational college, Mangalore, India
 Bangalore Institute of Technology, an institution of higher learning in India
 Beijing Institute of Technology, a university in China
 Birla Institute of Technology, Mesra, an engineering institute in Ranchi, India
 Birla Institute of Technology, Patna, an engineering institute in Patna, India
 BIT International College, formerly the Bohol Institute of Technology or BIT, in Bohol, Philippines
 BIT Sathy or Bannari Amman Institute of Technology, India
 Bhilai Institute of Technology – Durg, in Central India
 Bangladesh International Tutorial- A school in Dhaka

Science and technology
 Built-in test, in electronics
 BIT (alternative information centre), a communal information service which derived its name from the smallest unit of computer information
 Benzisothiazolinone, a biocide
 BIT Numerical Mathematics a journal of mathematics
Binary indexed tree, a data structure

Other uses
 Bit people, an ethnic group in Laos
 Bit language, spoken by the Bit people
 Bit (money)
 Bachelor of Information Technology, a degree
 Bilateral investment treaty
 Bit or Bitburger, the beer of the Bitburger brewery
 Bit, magazine for owners of home computers published by Ultrasoft
 BIT, the National Rail station code for Bicester Village railway station, Oxford, England
 Bit, a traditional valtelinese cheese

See also

 
 

 BITS (disambiguation)
 Bitts, paired vertical posts used to secure  a ship's mooring lines, ropes, hawsers, or cables
 Bitten (disambiguation)

Language and nationality disambiguation pages